Jalan Abdullah (Jawi: جالن عبدالله) is a major road in Bandar Maharani Muar, Johor, Malaysia. It was named after Dato Abdullah bin Jaafar, the State Commissioner from 1906 to 1912 and Dato' Menteri Besar (Chief Minister) of Johor from 1926.

Attractions

Landmarks
 Padang Nyiru and Muar Clock Tower
 Fung Seng Bakery
 Arked Muar

Maharani Uptown
Located at Jalan Sisi.

List of junctions along the road

Roads in Muar